In statistical analysis, the rule of three states that if a certain event did not occur in a sample with  subjects, the interval from 0 to 3/ is a 95% confidence interval for the rate of occurrences in the population. When  is greater than 30, this is a good approximation of results from more sensitive tests. For example, a pain-relief drug is tested on 1500 human subjects, and no adverse event is recorded. From the rule of three, it can be concluded with 95% confidence that fewer than 1 person in 500 (or 3/1500) will experience an adverse event.

The rule is useful in the interpretation of clinical trials generally, particularly in phase II and phase III where often there are limitations in duration or statistical power. The rule of three applies well beyond medical research, to any trial done  times. If 300 parachutes are randomly tested and all open successfully, then it is concluded with 95% confidence that fewer than 1 in 100 parachutes with the same characteristics (3/300) will fail.

Derivation
A 95% confidence interval is sought for the probability p of an event occurring for any randomly selected single individual in a population, given that it has not been observed to occur in n Bernoulli trials. Denoting the number of events by X, we therefore wish to find the values of the parameter p of a binomial distribution that give Pr(X = 0) ≤ 0.05. The rule can then be derived either from the Poisson approximation to the binomial distribution, or from the formula (1−p)n for the probability of zero events in the binomial distribution. In the latter case, the edge of the confidence interval is given by Pr(X = 0) = 0.05 and hence (1−p)n = .05 so n ln(1–p) = ln .05 ≈ −2.996. Rounding the latter to −3 and using the approximation, for p close to 0, that ln(1−p) ≈ −p (Taylor's formula), we obtain the interval's boundary 3/n.

Extension
The Vysochanskij–Petunin inequality shows that the rule of three holds for unimodal distributions with finite variance beyond just the binomial distribution, and gives a way to change the factor 3 if a different confidence is desired. Chebyshev's inequality removes the assumption of unimodality at the price of a higher multiplier (about 4.5 for 95% confidence). Cantelli's inequality is the one-tailed version of Chebyshev's inequality.

See also
Binomial proportion confidence interval
Rule of succession

Notes

References

 Ziliak, S. T.; D. N. McCloskey (2008). The cult of statistical significance: How the standard error costs us jobs, justice, and lives. University of Michigan Press. 

Clinical trials
Statistical approximations
Medical statistics
Nursing research